Erker's Optical Co. of St. Louis, Missouri is an optical company started in 1879 by A.P. Erker. A.P. Erker's brother, Olympic gold medalist August Erker later joined the business. Mr. Erker was one of the official photographers of the 1904 World's Fair. Erker's is still run by the Erker family; the current president being Jack Erker Jr. Erker's owns many photos of the 1904 World's Fair, as the company sponsored its official photographer. Erker's also supplied Charles Lindbergh with the goggles that he used in his 1927 transatlantic flight in The Spirit of St. Louis.

References

External links 
 Official homepage

Companies based in St. Louis